Disterna forrestensis is a species of beetle in the family Cerambycidae. It was described by Keith Collingwood McKeown in 1948. It is known from Australia.

See also
Common and Unusual Beetles in Australia

References

Zygocerini
Beetles described in 1948
Beetles of Australia